Pinpoint or pin point may refer to:
Pinpoint citation
Pin-point method (ecology)
Microsoft Pinpoint
Pinpoint Oxford
Pinpoint pupil
 Pinpoint aka waypoint
Pin Point, Georgia, an unincorporated community in Chatham County, Georgia, U.S.A.

See also 
Point of interest